Ryukyuan missions to Joseon were diplomatic and trade ventures of the Ryūkyū Kingdom which were intermittently sent in the years 1392–1879. These diplomatic contacts were within the Sinocentric system of bilateral and multinational relationships in East Asia. The Ryukyuan King Satto established formal relations with the Joseon court.

These diplomatic contacts represented a significant aspect of the international relations of mutual Ryukyuan-Joseon contacts and communication. Ryukyuan missions are recorded in late-Goryeo diplomatic history; and these diplomatic and trade relations continue uninterrupted until the war years of 1592–1598.

Responding to dynastic change
Yi Seong-gye declared a new dynasty in 1392–1393 under the name of Joseon (meaning to revive an older dynasty also known as Joseon, founded nearly four thousand years previously). The country was to be called the "Kingdom of Great Joseon". Shortly after his ascension, the new monarch sent envoys to inform the Ming court at Nanking that a dynastic change had taken place.

In 1392, the envoy from the Ryūkyū Kingdom to the court of the Goryeo monarch became among the first foreign representatives to appear in the court of the new king of what would be called the Joseon Dynasty. In this period, the historic, political, and diplomatic material for research on relations with the Ryukyus are encompassed within the Annals of Joseon Dynasty (Joseon Wangjo Sillok).

Missions to Joseon
Envoys form the Ryūkyū Kingdom were received in 1392. Ryūkyū also sent missions in 1394 and 1397. Between 1409 and 1477, the Joseon court received 13 diplomatic and trade missions from the Ryūkyū Islands.

 1392 – An envoy and his retinue from the Kingdom of Ryūkyū are recorded as having been received at the Joseon court. The Joseon Wangjo Sillok records that the envoys from Ryūkyū were accorded "East fifth rank lower grade" Their retainers were accorded "sixth rank lower grade." The Ryūkyū delegation offered what are identified as pangmul, which is the term for gifts offered by subordinate states.
 1394 – An envoy and his retinue from the Kingdom of Ryūkyū were received.
 1397 – An envoy and his retinue from the Kingdom of Ryūkyū were received.

See also
 Joseon missions to the Ryukyu Kingdom

Notes

References
 Ch'oe, Po and John Thomas Meskill. (1965). Diary: a Record of Drifting Across the Sea. Tucson: University of Arizona Press. OCLC 16739180
 Codesaca, Maria Silvia. "A Korean's Drift to the Ryukyus in the 15th Century." Korea Journal, Vol. 15, No. 9 (September 1975). pp. 42–49.
 Goodrich, Luther Carrington and Zhaoying Fang. (1976). Dictionary of Ming biography, 1368-1644 (明代名人傳), Vol. I; Dictionary of Ming biography, 1368-1644 (明代名人傳), Vol. II. New York: Columbia University Press. ; ; 
 Hong-Schunka, S.M. (2005). "An Aspect of East Asian Maritime Trade: The Exchange of Commodities between Korea and Ryukyu (1389-1638)," in Trade and Transfer across the East Asian 'Mediterranean', Angela Schottenhammer, ed. Wiesbaden: Harrassowitz, 2005.
 Hussain, Tariq. (2006). Diamond Dilemma: Shaping Korea for the 21st Century. (다이아몬드딜레마). Seoul: Random House. ; OCLC 180102797 ; OCLC 67712109 
 Kerr, George H. (1965). Okinawa, the History of an Island People. Rutland, Vermont: C.E. Tuttle Co. OCLC 39242121
 Kobata, Atsushi and Mitsugu Matsuda. (1969). Ryukyuan Relations with Korea and South Sea Countries: An Annotated Translation of Documents in the "Rekidai Hoan". Kyoto: Kobata Atsushi.
 Lee, Hyoun-jong. "Military Aid of the Ryukyus and other Southern Asian Nations to Korea: During the Hideyoshi Invasions," Journal of the Social Sciences and Humanities, Vol. 46 (December 1977). pp. 13–24.
 Robinson, Kenneth R. "The Haedong Chegukki (1471) and Korean-Ryukyuan Relations, 1389-1471: Part I," Acta Koreana, Vol. 3 (2000). pp. 87–98.
 Robinson, Kenneth R. "The Haedong Chegukki (1471) and Korean-Ryukyuan Relations, 1389-1471: Part II," Acta Koreana, Vol. 4 (2001). pp. 115–142.
 Toby, Ronald P. (1991). State and Diplomacy in Early Modern Japan: Asia in the Development of the Tokugawa Bakufu. Stanford: Stanford University Press. 
 Yi, I-hwa. (2006). Korea's Pastimes and Customs a Social History. Paramus, New Jersey: Homa & Sekey Books. ;

Further reading
 Kobata, Atsushi and Mitsugu Matsuda. (1969). Ryukyuan Relations with Korea and South Sea Countries; an Annotated Translation of Documents in the Rekidai Hōan. Kyoto:     . OCLC 221947347

Foreign relations of the Ryukyu Kingdom
Foreign relations of the Joseon dynasty